The Trial of Lee Harvey Oswald is a 1967 American play.

The play's production and the actor who played Lee Harvey Oswald, Peter Masterson, are profiled in the William Goldman book The Season: A Candid Look at Broadway.

Robin Wagner designed the set of The Trial of Lee Harvey Oswald.

References

External links
 

1967 plays
Cultural depictions of Lee Harvey Oswald